Complicated is the second studio album by American singer Nivea, released in the United States on May 3, 2005 on Jive Records. It was primarily produced by her then-husband The-Dream, with additional production from Lil Jon, R. Kelly, Bryan Michael Cox and Jermaine Dupri. The album peaked at No. 37 on the US Billboard 200 album charts and peaked at No. 9 on the R&B chart. Complicated was critically acclaimed, but failed to receive major commercial success, eventually becoming Nivea's lowest selling album to date with just over 100,000 copies sold in the US.

"Okay", the album's lead single, was already recorded back in 2003. Though it was clear that the track was going to be released as a single, the record company kept it under closure to introduce the upcoming crunk&B style with newcomer Ciara and her "Goodies" track. No other single was released from Complicated due to a recall on the album for having a content-protector and some discs would not play, so Nivea decided to leave Jive Records not long after the album's release.

Singles
"Okay", the album's lead single, was already recorded back in 2003. Though it was clear that the track was going to be released as a single, the record company kept it under closure to introduce the upcoming crunk&B style with newcomer Ciara and her "Goodies" track. The single became a hit, peaking at No. 14 on R&B and No. 40 on Billboard's Hot 100. 

A second single, "Parking Lot" was released shortly before she got pregnant with her first child. Jive Records subsequently dropped promotion for the project, although she appeared on Soul Train the following year and performed "Complicated" which was originally planned to be the third single. After her departure from the label, she gave birth to her twins in April.

Critical reception

AllMusic's Andy Kellman was not impressed with Complicated. He wrote that the album "contains a couple should-be successful singles, but it's far too patchy to be considered better than the debut. More sexually upfront and as sweet-voiced as ever, Nivea still needs more than a couple hot producers and guest MCs to truly stick out."

Track listing

Notes and sample credits
 denotes co-producer
 denotes vocal producer
 denotes additional producer
"I Can't Mess with You" contains a sample of "You Are Everything" by The Stylistics.
"My Fault (Ghetto Apology)" contains a sample of "For the Love of You" by The Isley Brothers.

Personnel
Performers and musicians

 Fletcher Dozier Jr. – guitar
 Donnie Lyle – guitar
 Eddie E. Hamilton – guitar
 Julio Miranda – guitar

Technical

 Nivea Nash – executive producer
 Terius "The Dream" Nash – executive producer, producer
 Larry "Rock" Campbell – A&R, producer,
 Bryan Michael Cox – producer 
 Jermaine Dupri – producer
 Lil Jon – producer
 R. Kelly – producer
 The Platinum Brothers – producer
 Nastacia "Nazz" Kendall – producer
 Vocal assistance: Sakinah Lestage
 Brian Frye – engineer
 Andy Gallas – engineer
 Abel Garibaldi – engineer
 Matthew Malpass – engineer
 Ian Mereness – engineer
 Ray Seay – engineer
 Rich Tapper – engineer
 Steve Bearsley – assistant engineer
 Josh Copp – assistant engineer
 Jason Mlodzinski – assistant engineer
 Keith Sengbusch – assistant engineer
 Rob Skipworth – assistant engineer
 Adam Smith – assistant engineer
 Nathan Wheeler – assistant engineer
 Leslie Braithwaite – mixing
 Kevin "KD" Davis – mixing
 John Frye – mixing
 Serban Ghenea – mixing
 Brian Stanley – mixing
 Phil Tan – mixing
 Warren Bletcher – mixing assistance
 Kris Lewis – mixing assistance
 Tom Coyne – mastering
 Wayne Williams – A&R
 Elisa Garcia – art direction
 Denise Trorman – art direction
 Jonathan Mannion – photography

Charts

References

2005 albums
Albums produced by Bryan-Michael Cox
Albums produced by Jermaine Dupri
Albums produced by Lil Jon
Albums produced by R. Kelly
Albums produced by The-Dream
Nivea (singer) albums